Tana Glacier is a  long glacier in the U.S. state of Alaska. It begins at Bagley Icefield and flows northwest to its 1950 terminus near the head of the Tana River. Its name, of Alaska Native origin, was first recorded by prospectors in 1900.
The warmest month is August, at -2 ° C, and the coldest month is January, at -20 ° C.

See also
 List of glaciers

References

External links

Glaciers of Alaska
Glaciers of Copper River Census Area, Alaska
Glaciers of Unorganized Borough, Alaska